Corneli Vasile Curuzan (born March 19, 1974) is a Romanian sprint canoer who competed from the late 1990s to the mid-2000s. He won four medals at the ICF Canoe Sprint World Championships with three silvers (K-4 200 m: 2003, K-4 500 m: 2001, 2003) and a bronze (K-4 1000 m: 1999).

Curuzan also competed in two Summer Olympics, earning his best finish of seventh in the K-4 1000 m event at Athens in 2004.

References

Sports-reference.com profile

1974 births
Canoeists at the 2000 Summer Olympics
Canoeists at the 2004 Summer Olympics
Living people
Olympic canoeists of Romania
Romanian male canoeists
ICF Canoe Sprint World Championships medalists in kayak